The Chinese Journal of Physics is a bimonthly peer-reviewed scientific journal covering all aspects of physics. It is published by Elsevier on behalf of the Physical Society of Taiwan. The journal publishes reviews, articles, and refereed conference papers in all the major areas of physics. The editor-in-chief is Fu-Jen Kao.

References

External links

Physics journals
Elsevier academic journals
Publications established in 1963
Bimonthly journals
English-language journals